Tricholeiochiton is a genus of insects belonging to the family Hydroptilidae.

The species of this genus are found in Europe, Southern Africa and Australia.

Species:
 Tricholeiochiton fagesii (Guinard, 1879)
 Tricholeiochiton fortensis (Ulmer, 1951)

References

Hydroptilidae
Trichoptera genera